Mari-Liis Lill (born on 23 May 1983 in Tallinn) is an Estonian actress.

Lill graduated from the Estonian Academy of Music and Theatre in 2006. From 2006 until 2015, she was engaged at the Estonian Drama Theatre.

Besides stage roles he has also participated on several films.

In 2021 he was awarded with Order of the White Star, V class.

Lill is in a relationship with actor and musician Ivo Uukkivi. The couple have a son, born in 2011.

Filmography

 2006 "Meeletu" – a girl
 2006/2007 "Ringtee"
 2007 "Jan Uuspõld läheb Tartusse" – Marion
 2007 "Detour/Võõras" – Anna
 2011 "Kirjad Inglile" – occulist
 2012 "Seenelkäik" – a local woman
 2016 "Õnn tuleb magades" – Luisa
 2018 "Tuliliilia" – Annely
 2020 "Kratt" – Mother

References

Living people
1983 births
Estonian stage actresses
Estonian film actresses
Estonian television actresses
21st-century Estonian actresses
Recipients of the Order of the White Star, 4th Class
Estonian Academy of Music and Theatre alumni
Actresses from Tallinn